is a Japanese castle in Chūō-ku, Osaka, Japan. The castle is one of Japan's most famous landmarks and it played a major role in the unification of Japan during the sixteenth century of the Azuchi-Momoyama period.

Layout
The main tower of Osaka Castle is situated on a plot of land roughly one square kilometre. It is built on two raised platforms of landfill supported by sheer walls of cut rock, using a technique called burdock piling, each overlooking a moat. The central castle building is five stories on the outside and eight stories on the inside, and built atop a tall stone foundation to protect its occupants from attackers.

The Main Tower is surrounded by a series of moats and defensive fortifications. The castle has 2 moats (an inner & outer). The inner castle moat lies within the castle grounds, and consists of 2 types: a wet (northern-easterly) and dry (south-westerly). Outer moat meanwhile surrounds the entire castle premise, denotes the castle's outer limits, and consists of 4 individual water-filled sections, each representing a cardinal direction (North, East, South, West).

The castle grounds, which cover approximately 61,000 square metres (15 acres), contain the following thirteen structures that were denoted as “important cultural assets” by the Japanese government: 
Ote-mon Gate
Sakura-mon Gate 
Ichiban-yagura Turret
Inui-yagura Turret
Rokuban-yagura Turret
Sengan Turret
Tamon Turret
Kinmeisui Well
Kinzo Storehouse
Enshogura Gunpowder Magazine
Three sections of castle wall all located around Otemon Gate
Megaliths at the castle include the Octopus stone.
The outer moat has two main sentry checkpoints: the Aoyamon Gate (in the north-east) and the Otemon Gate (in the opposing south-west). 

Between the outer and inner moat are the following: Fushimi-yagura Turret Remains, Ensho-gura Gunpowder Storehouse, Osaka Geihinkan, Hoshoan Tea House, Osaka Castle Nishinomaru Garden, Sengan-yagura Turret, Tamon-yagura Turret, Remains of Taiko-yagura Turret, Osaka Shudokan Martial Arts Hall, Hokoku Shrine (Osaka), Ichiban-yagura Turret (The first turret), and Plum Grove.

There are two places to cross the inner moat, Gokuraku-bashi Bridge (located in the North) and Sakuramon Gate (main sentry point in the South).

Within the inner moat, the castle was divided into two major areas: the Hommaru (Inner Bailey) and the Yamazato-Maru Bailey. Located within the Hommaru is the Main Tower, the Kimmeisui Well, the Japanese Garden, the Takoishi (Octopus Stone), the Gimmeisui Well, the Miraiza Osakajo Complex, the Kinzo Treasure House, and the "Timecapsule Expo'70". While within the Yamazato-Maru Bailey consists of the Marked-Stones Square, and the Monument commemorating 'Hideyori and Yodo-dono committing suicide'.

History

In 1583 Toyotomi Hideyoshi commenced construction on the site of the Ikkō-ikki temple of Ishiyama Hongan-ji. The basic plan was modeled after Azuchi Castle, the headquarters of Oda Nobunaga. Hideyoshi wanted to build a castle that mirrored Nobunaga's, but surpassed it in every way: the plan featured a five-story main tower, with three extra stories underground, and gold leaf on the sides of the tower to impress visitors. In 1585 the Inner donjon was completed. Hideyoshi continued to extend and expand the castle, making it more and more formidable to attackers. In 1597 construction was completed and Hideyoshi died the year after. Osaka Castle passed to his son, Toyotomi Hideyori.

In 1600 Tokugawa Ieyasu defeated his opponents at the Battle of Sekigahara, and started his own bakufu (i.e., shogunate) in Edo. In 1614 Tokugawa attacked Hideyori in the winter, starting the Siege of Osaka. Although the Toyotomi forces were outnumbered approximately two to one, they managed to fight off Tokugawa's 200,000-man army and protect the castle's outer walls. Ieyasu had the castle's outer moat filled, negating one of the castle's main outer defenses.

During the summer of 1615, Hideyori began to restore the outer moat. Ieyasu, in outrage, sent his armies to Osaka Castle again, and routed the Toyotomi men inside the outer walls on June 4.

Osaka Castle fell to the Tokugawa clan, the Toyotomi clan perished, Hideyori and Yodo-dono committed seppuku and the castle buildings burned to the ground.

In 1620, the new heir to the shogunate, Tokugawa Hidetada, began to reconstruct and re-arm Osaka Castle. He built a new elevated main tower, five stories on the outside and eight stories on the inside, and assigned the task of constructing new walls to individual samurai clans. The walls built in the 1620s still stand today, and are made out of interlocked granite boulders without mortar. Many of the stones were brought from rock quarries near the Seto Inland Sea, and bear inscribed crests of the various families who contributed them.

Construction of the 5 story tenshu started in 1628 and was completed 2 years later, about the same time the rest of the reconstruction, and followed the general layout of the original Toyotomi structure.

In 1660, lightning ignited the gunpowder warehouse and the resulting explosion set the castle on fire.

In 1665, lightning struck and burnt down the tenshu. In 1843, after decades of neglect, the castle got much-needed repairs when the bakufu collected money from the people of the region to rebuild several of the turrets.

In 1868, Osaka Castle fell and was surrendered to anti-bakufu imperial loyalists. Much of the castle was burned in the civil conflicts surrounding the Meiji Restoration.

Under the Meiji government, Osaka Castle became part of the Osaka Army Arsenal (Osaka Hohei Kosho) manufacturing guns, ammunition, and explosives for Japan's rapidly expanding Western-style military.

In 1931, the ferroconcrete tenshu was built.

During World War II, the arsenal became one of the largest military armories, employing 60,000 workers. American bombing raids targeting the arsenal damaged the reconstructed main castle tower and, on August 14, 1945, destroyed 90% of the arsenal and killed 382 people working there.

In 1995, Osaka's government approved yet another restoration project, with the intent of restoring the main tower to its Edo-era splendor.  In 1997, restoration was completed. The castle is a concrete reproduction (including elevators) of the original and the interior is intended as a modern, functioning museum.

Views of the castle

Access
The castle is open to the public and is easily accessible from Osakajōkōen Station on the JR West Osaka Loop Line. It is a popular spot during festival seasons, and especially during the cherry blossom bloom (hanami), when the sprawling castle grounds are covered with food vendors and taiko drummers. The large indoor arena, Osaka-jō Hall, also is located within the grounds of the castle park.

In popular culture
 In the 1955 Toho tokusatsu film Godzilla Raids Again, Godzilla's battle with Anguirus leads onto the castle grounds. The structure itself collapses when Godzilla pins Anguirus against it.
 in the 1966 tokusatsu film, Gamera vs. Barugon, the titular monsters' first encounter is at the site of the castle.
 The castle appears in a two-parter of the iconic 1966 tokusatsu television series, Ultraman where the titular hero does battle with the monster Gomora on the castle grounds. 
 In 1975, British novelist James Clavell used the castle and its environs (circa 1600) as a major plot location for his most famous work of historical fiction, Shōgun.
 The castle was featured in the finale of The Amazing Race 20, where it hosted a Pit Stop.
 In the 2002 film Suicide Club, it is reported that 200 high school girls jumped off the Osaka Castle.

See also

Himeji Castle
Jurakudai
Fushimi Castle
List of Special Places of Scenic Beauty, Special Historic Sites and Special Natural Monuments
List of foreign-style castles in Japan
Tourism in Japan

References

Literature
Benesch, Oleg. "Castles and the Militarisation of Urban Society in Imperial Japan," Transactions of the Royal Historical Society, Vol. 28 (Dec. 2018), pp. 107-134.

De Lange, William. (2022). The Siege of Osaka Castle: The Winter and Summer Campaigns''. Groningen: Toyo Press.

External links

 

 
Buildings and structures in Osaka
Tourist attractions in Osaka
Chūō-ku, Osaka
Castles in Osaka Prefecture
History museums in Japan
Museums in Osaka
Buildings and structures in Japan destroyed during World War II
Rebuilt buildings and structures in Japan
Special Historic Sites